The National Forest Authority is the body of the Ugandan central government that is responsible for managing the country's Central Forest Reserves. It was created as a semi-autonomous corporation through the National Forestry and Tree Planting Act of 2003 to replace the prior Forestry Department.

Overview 
The National Forestry Authority was established by the Act of Parliament in 2003 to replace the century-old Forest Department which as a purely government department had failed to address the challenges that the forestry sector was facing in the 1970s through to the 1990s. The mandate of the National Forestry Authority is to manage Central Forest Reserves on a sustainable basis and to supply other high quality forestry- related products and services in accordance with sound financial and commercial practice.

References

External links 
 

Government agencies of Uganda
Organizations established in 2003
2003 establishments in Uganda
Uganda
Forestry in Uganda